María del Rocío García Olmedo (born 30 April 1957) is a Mexican politician affiliated with the PRI. She currently serves as Deputy of the LXII Legislature of the Mexican Congress representing Puebla.

References

1957 births
Living people
Politicians from Puebla
Women members of the Chamber of Deputies (Mexico)
Institutional Revolutionary Party politicians
21st-century Mexican politicians
21st-century Mexican women politicians
Deputies of the LXII Legislature of Mexico
Members of the Chamber of Deputies (Mexico) for Puebla